Straight in No Kissin' is the second studio album by the American rock band Big Talk. The album was released worldwide on July 24, 2015.

Track listing
All tracks written by John Konesky, Taylor Milne, John Spiker, Ronnie Vannucci Jr and Brooks Wackerman

Critical reception

Personnel
Ronnie Vannucci Jr – vocals, rhythm guitar, keyboards
Taylor Milne – lead guitar
John Konesky – rhythm and lead guitar
John Spiker – bass
Brooks Wackerman – drums

References

2015 albums
Big Talk albums